Bracht is a locality in the municipality Schmallenberg in the High Sauerland District in North Rhine-Westphalia, Germany.

The village has 453 inhabitants and lies in the west of the municipality of Schmallenberg at a height of around 464 m. In the village centre the Landstraße 928  meets the Landstraße 737. Bracht borders on the villages of Werntrop, Kückelheim, Rotbusch, Hebbecke and Brenschede.

The village used to belong to the municipality of Wormbach in Amt Schmallenberg until the end of 1974.

Gallery

External links 
Pv-se.de: Bracht

References

Villages in North Rhine-Westphalia
Schmallenberg